Neostrearia is a genus of flowering plants belonging to the family Hamamelidaceae.

Its native range is Northeastern Queensland.

Species
Species:
 Neostrearia fleckeri L.S.Sm.

References

Hamamelidaceae
Saxifragales genera